Reinhard Eiben (born 4 December 1951) is a retired East German slalom canoeist who won an individual gold medal at the 1972 Olympics. He won two more gold medals at the world championships, in the C-1 event in 1973 and in the C-1 team event in 1977.

References

1951 births
Canoeists at the 1972 Summer Olympics
German male canoeists
Living people
Olympic canoeists of East Germany
Olympic gold medalists for East Germany
Olympic medalists in canoeing
International whitewater paddlers
Medalists at the 1972 Summer Olympics
Medalists at the ICF Canoe Slalom World Championships
People from Zwickau (district)
Sportspeople from Saxony